Tamana may refer to:

 Tamana, Kiribati, an island
 Tamana, Kumamoto, a city in Kumamoto Prefecture, Japan
 Tamana, Wallis and Futuna, a village

See also
 Tamana (NGO), an Indian non profit organization
 Tamana caves, a cave system in Trinidad and Tobago